Life Classes is a 1987 Canadian drama film directed by William D. MacGillivray.

Plot 
Mary Cameron (Cormier) lives on the Canadian island of Cape Breton, Nova Scotia. There, she enjoys a warm relationship with an old woman she calls Nanny (Garbary), who regales her with stories of the Gaelic past. The rest of her time, when she isn't working at her father's pharmacy, she completes paint by numbers artworks. On discovering that she is pregnant by her boyfriend, she decides to go to Halifax, to have her baby. After giving birth, she starts modeling for life-drawing classes and eventually picks up the skills of an artist herself. Soon, she has become a successful artist and moves back to the house her friend Nanny left her to fill an entirely new role in her community.

Cast
 Jacinta Cormier as Mary Cameron
 Leon Dubinsky as Earl
 Leo Jessome as Mary's father
 Frances Knickle as Gloria

Awards 
 1988
 Genie Award for Best Motion Picture - Nominated (Stephen Reynolds)
 Genie Award for Best Original Song - Nominated (William D. MacGillivray)
 Genie Award for Best Performance by an Actor in a Supporting Role - Nominated (Leon Dubinsky)
 Genie Award for Best Performance by an Actress in a Leading Role - Nominated (Jacinta Cormier)
 Genie Award for Best Original Screenplay - Nominated (William D. MacGillivray)
 38th Berlin International Film Festival: Golden Bear - Nominated
 1989
 Istanbul International Film Festival Special Prize of the Jury - William D. MacGillivray - Won

References

External links 
 
 
 

1987 films
English-language Canadian films
1987 drama films
Canadian drama films
Films directed by William D. MacGillivray
Films set in Nova Scotia
Films shot in Nova Scotia
1980s English-language films
1980s Canadian films